Monique Adams is a former female American volleyball player who played collegiately for Louisiana State University (LSU) as an outside hitter. She was an AVCA All-American and played in back-to-back NCAA Women's Volleyball Championship Final Fours in 1990 and 1991. She was named MVP of the 1991 SEC Tournament and was also a member of the U.S. Junior National (B) Team in 1989. She was also one of only three players from LSU to be named to the AVCA All-American First-Team.

See also

 1991 NCAA Division I women's volleyball tournament

References 

American women's volleyball players
LSU Tigers women's volleyball players
Panathinaikos Women's Volleyball players
Living people
Year of birth missing (living people)
Outside hitters